India is home to several hundred languages. Most Indians speak a language belonging to the families of the Indo-Aryan branch of Indo-European (c. 77%), the Dravidian (c. 20.61%), the Austroasiatic (Munda) (c. 1.2%), or the Sino-Tibetan (c. 0.8%), with some languages of the Himalayas still unclassified. The SIL Ethnologue lists 415 living languages for India.

Overview 
India does not have a national language. However, Rule 1976 (As Amended, 1987) of the Constitution of India, mandates Hindi and English as the "Official Languages" required "for Official Purpose of the Union." Business in the Indian parliament is transacted in either Hindi or in English. English is allowed for official purposes such as parliamentary proceedings, judiciary, communications between the Central Government and a State Government.

States within India have the liberty and powers to select their own official language(s) through legislation. In addition to the two Official Languages, the constitution recognizes 22 regional languages, named in a specific list as "Scheduled Languages". (Hindi is a listed Scheduled Language but English is not.) India's Constitution includes provisions detailing the languages used for the official purposes of the union, the languages used for the official purposes of each state and union territory and the languages used for communication between the union and the states.

Hindi is the most widely spoken language in the northern parts of India. The Indian census takes the widest possible definition of "Hindi" as a broad variety of the "Hindi Belt". According to 2001 Census, 53.6% of the Indian population declared that they speak Hindi as either their first or second language, in which 41% of them have declared it as their native language. 12% of Indians declared that they can speak English as a second language.

Thirteen languages account for more than 1% of Indian population each, and between themselves for over 95%; all of them are "scheduled languages of the constitution". Scheduled languages spoken by fewer than 1% of Indians are Santali (0.63%), Kashmiri (0.54%), Nepali (0.28%), Sindhi (0.25%), Konkani (0.24%), Dogri (0.22%), Meitei (0.14%), Bodo (0.13%) and Sanskrit (In the 2001 census of India, 14,135 people reported Sanskrit as their native language). The largest language that is not "scheduled" is Bhili (0.95%), followed by Gondi (0.27%), Khandeshi (0.21%), Tulu (0.17%) and Kurukh (0.10%).

As per 2011 census, 26% of Indians are bilingual and 7% are trilingual.

India has a Greenberg's diversity index of 0.914—i.e. two people selected at random from the country will have different native languages in 91.4% of cases.

As per the 2011 Census of India, languages by highest number of speakers are as follows: Hindi, Bengali, Marathi, Telugu, Tamil, Gujarati, Urdu, Kannada, Odia, Malayalam.

List of languages by number of native speakers 
Ordered by number of speakers as first language.

More than one million speakers 

The 2011 census recorded 31 individual languages as having more than 1 million native speakers (0.1% of total population). The languages in bold are scheduled languages (the only scheduled language with less than 1 million native speakers is Sanskrit). The first table is restricted to only speaking populations for scheduled languages.

* Excludes figures of Paomata, Mao-Maram and Purul sub-divisions of Senapati district of Manipur for 2001.
** The percentage of speakers of each language for 2001 has been worked out on the total population of India excluding the population of Mao-Maram, Paomata and Purul subdivisions of Senapati district of Manipur due to cancellation of census results.

100,000 to one million speakers

List of mother tongues by number of speakers 
Each of the languages of the 2001 census subsumes one or more mother tongues. Speaker numbers are available for these mother tongues and they are also included in the speaker numbers for their respective language. For example, the language Telugu (with a total of 81,127,740 speakers) includes the mother tongues of Telugu (with 80,912,459 speakers), Vadari (198,020 speakers) and "Others" (17,261 speakers).  The General Notes from the 2001 census define "mother tongue" as "the language spoken in childhood by the person's mother to the person. If the mother died in infancy, the language mainly spoken in the person's home in childhood will be the mother tongue."

The following table lists those mother tongues that have more than one million speakers according to the 2011 census:

Notes

See also 
 Languages with official status in India
 List of endangered languages in India

References

General references 
 Data table of Census of India, 2001
 Language Maps from Central Institute of Indian Languages
 Scheduled Languages in descending order of speaker's strength – 2001
 Comparative ranking of scheduled languages in descending order of speaker's strength-1971, 1981, 1991 and 2001
 Census data on Languages
 C-16 Population By Mother Tongue – Town Level
 C-16 Population By Mother Tongue

External links 
 
 https://web.archive.org/web/20050109084200/http://www.ethnologue.com/show_country.asp?name=India Ethnologue report
 [https://web.archive.org/web/20041213203632/http://www.ciil.org/ Central Institute of Indian Languages

 
Indian culture-related lists
India, number of native speakers